The Assistant Chief of Armed Forces Training & Procurement (C PROD FPE/C FÖRBPROD, sometimes as Chefen för förbandsproduktion) or Chief of Training  is a two-star role within the Training & Procurement Staff in the Swedish Armed Forces Headquarters, responsible for the Swedish military academies and Swedish Armed Forces Human Resources Center. The Assistant Chief of Armed Forces Training & Procurement reports to the Chief of Armed Forces Training & Procurement.

Organisation
The Assistant Chief of Armed Forces Training & Procurement is also the Chief of Training (Utbildningschef).

The Assistant Chief of Armed Forces Training & Procurement together with the Chief of Army, Chief of Navy and Chief of Air Force as well as the Chief of Management System (Ledningssystemchefen, LSC), Chief of Defence Logistics, (Resursproduktionschefen, C PROD RPE) and the Chief of Home Guard reports to the Chief of Armed Forces Training & Procurement.

The following units reports to the Assistant Chief of Armed Forces Training & Procurement: the Swedish Armed Forces Human Resources Center (Försvarsmaktens HR-centrum, FM HRC), Military Academy Karlberg and Military Academy Halmstad (Militärhögskolan Halmstad, MHS H).

Assistant Chiefs of Armed Forces Training & Procurement

Footnotes

References

Notes

Print

Military appointments of Sweden